is a Japanese light novel series written by Ennki Hakari and illustrated by KeG. It began serialization online in October 2014 on the novel self-publishing website Shōsetsuka ni Narō. It was later acquired by Overlap, who have published ten volumes since June 2015 under their Overlap Novels imprint. A manga adaptation with art by Akira Sawano has been serialized online via Overlap's Comic Gardo website since February 2017 and has been collected in eleven tankōbon volumes. Both the light novel and manga are licensed in North America by Seven Seas Entertainment. An anime television series adaptation by Studio Kai and Hornets aired from April to June 2022.

Plot
Upon awakening, an unnamed gamer finds himself in the avatar body and armor that he was using in his online game. Seeing his reflection in a river, he is shocked to discover that his appearance is that of a skeleton due to the special avatar skin『Skeleton』he used. In unfamiliar territory, the gamer decides that it would be best to hide his appearance by never removing his helmet and to search for inhabitants. He spies a band of bandits attacking a group at a distance and springs into action, killing the brigands after seeing them about to rape two women. The women introduce themselves as Lauren du Luvierte, a noblewoman, and Rita Farren, her maid. Using his game name, the knight introduces himself as Arc and agrees to escort the two ladies to the town of Luvierte. While he refuses a reward (to avoid meeting Lauren's father Viscount Buckle du Luvierte, as it would cause complications should the noble ask to see his face), Rita gives him a copper passport to allow him easier passage through any city in the territory.

While dispatching a group of bandits using a cave as their hideout who had attacked him near the town of Diento, he discovers a wounded green-furred cottontailed fox ("ventu vulpis") being held in a cage. Freeing the creature, he heals its wound with magic and befriends it. The fox indicates that it wants to travel with him, and he names it "Ponta".

Later, Arc encounters a male elf outside Diento and learns about the human trade in capturing and enslaving elves. The elf is surprised that Ponta (which he refers to as a "spirit creature") is so attached to Arc and that Arc doesn't seem to share the fear and prejudice against elves that most humans in this world seem to have.

Some time afterwards, Arc stumbles across two elf soldiers, one male and one female, battling a band of human slavers; when their leader uses the captured elf children as hostages, the female elf seems ready to surrender when Arc intervenes and helps the elves wipe out the slavers. After Ponta's presence convinces the elves that Arc is a friend and the captured elves are freed and healed of their wounds by Arc's magic, the female elf, Ariane Glenys Maple, hires Arc to help her free other enslaved elves being held in Diento itself. Meeting up with Danka, another elf soldier who has been scouting inside Diento for information (and the one whom Arc had encountered earlier), the three invade the slave warehouse. During their initial search, Arc encounters a female cat-eared/tailed ninja, who gives him information about humans involved in the slave trade and about other captured elves being held in the local lord's castle. After freeing the captured elves, Arc uses Teleportation magic to get them all away from Diento, then he and Ariane head for the castle while Danka escorts the freed elves home. After they free the two female elves (who then "punish" their captor/tormentor in a particularly gruesome fashion) and escape, Ariane asks Arc to accompany her back to their lands. Arc is reluctant and shows why by removing his helmet, revealing his skeletal form. While initially shocked, Ariane realizes that, despite his appearance, Arc is not evil but under a curse, and promises that the elves will keep his secret.

At the elvish settlement of Lalatoya, Arc meets and is welcomed by Elder Dillan and his wife Glenys, who are also Ariane's parents. At a meeting of Elders, at which the information about human Nobles being involved in the slave trade and the clear violation of the Elf-Human peace treaty is discussed, it is decided that while no direct retaliation against the humans will be made, the secret operations to free elf slaves will continue. Dillan offers to hire Arc to continue helping Ariane, and as payment provides him with information about a magic pool in Dragon Lord country that may lift his skeleton curse. Arc agrees, and he and Ariane, with Ponta, begin their quest to free the captured/enslaved elves and totally end the slave trade. They are joined in their mission by Chiyome, the ninja Arc had previously encountered and a member of the Jinshin Clan of beast people, who is engaged on a similar mission to free her fellow beast people who have likewise been captured and enslaved by humans. 

Meanwhile in Olav, the capital city of the Rhoden Kingdom, King Karlon, who has learned of the possible involvement of nobility in the slave trade in elves thanks to the events in Diento, dispatches his daughter Yuriarna on a diplomatic mission to the Grand Duchy of Limbult (which trades with the elves and where his older daughter Seriarna is the ruler's wife) to arrange a meeting with the elves. However, her older brothers Sekt and Dakares both have ambitions to inherit the throne and are vying with other for power, and Yuriarna suspects Dakares of being involved in the slave trade and Sekt of knowing about it but trying to use it for his own advantage...and that both will stop at nothing to achieve their goals, even if it means destroying anyone in their way.

As Arc, Ariane and Chiyome's quest progresses and they gain friends and allies while traveling to the different kingdoms across the world, they learn that the slave trade is merely the tip of the iceberg and that the Holy East Revlon Kingdom, ruled by the ruthless Emperor Domitianus, and this world's main religion, the Holy Hilk Kingdom, may be behind all the evil they're fighting to overcome.

Characters
 / 

A computer gamer who wakes up in the world of the fantasy game he has been playing to find himself transformed into the avatar he has been using in the game. In this world, he uses the name "Arc", which is the name of his game character; in the anime, Ariane's mother Glenys nicknames him "Arcky", and in Book 4 of the light novel series he takes the surname "Lalatoya" in honor of the elf village he has been granted permission to enter. His physical appearance in this world is extremely tall (two meters), and the armor he wears gives him the appearance of being powerfully built (his physical strength is actually quite superhuman; in the light novels a single punch can either knock off a foe's head or go right through the body; in Episode 11 of the anime even a mere head-flick is enough to send large men flying; and he is also able to wield his two-handed two-meter-long broadsword the Holy Sword of Caladbolg quite easily with one hand while ordinary people find it too heavy to even pick up). He also alters his speaking voice to sound deeper and more masculine, as befits his game character. The armor he wears is silver-colored with colored highlights; in the light novels the highlights are blue, while in the anime the highlights are gold-colored, and while the armor looks quite massive and heavy he does not feel any discomfort and seems able to move about quite easily and freely in it. Since the series begins with him waking up in this world, there is no current information as to his real name, what he really looks like, his past in his original world or how he arrived in/was transported to this world. It is obvious from the beginning that he has a strong moral sense and is always ready and willing to help or defend endangered or oppressed beings, whether humans, elves or beast people; he also is extremely polite (which, considering his size and supposed status as a "knight" due to his armor, surprises most ordinary people) and never hesitates to admit when a person, whether male or female, is his equal (such as the ninja Goemon) or superior in any way (such as Ariane, Glenys and Chiyome). He can get quite excited at certain things, but he is surprisingly quite unflappable in battle, even against giant monsters, and only gets angry once in the anime upon hearing the fate of captured elves at the hands of monster tamer Fumba. He proves to be a fairly talented cook when, in Volumes 5 and 6 of the light novel series, he whips up tasty meals for himself and his companions using local variants of ingredients from his home world, much to Ariane's surprise.

 / 

The second daughter of Elder Dillan Tahg Lalatoya and Glenys Alna Lalatoya (who, in the anime, calls her "Aria"), she is a female elf warrior of the elf capital city of Maple (elf names use the name of their gender parent as a middle name and the name of their registered village/city as a surname, hence her surname of "Maple"; however, in Volume 6 of the light novel series Glenys tells Arc that Ariane has changed her home registration [for her own reasons] from "Maple" to "Lalatoya"). In Volume 1 of the light novel series, her age is given as 50 years old (her physical appearance is much younger) and she is described as having amethyst-colored skin, golden-irised eyes and white hair (in the light novels, these are the unmistakable signs of a "dark elf"), while in the anime she has pale human-colored skin and pink hair (her eyes remain golden-irised). In Volume 1 of the light novel series, Arc first encounters her while she and another elf soldier are battling slavers in order to free captured elf children, while in the anime, he first encounters her in an alley in the town of Luvierte after her failed attempt to buy information and then again later when she attacks him mistaking him for one of the elf-enslaving bandits; in both the novels and anime, after the fight in which the elf children are freed she hires him to assist her. While an extremely skilled fighter, she feels inferior to her older sister Eevin (an extremely powerful and skilled warrior), and she has a deep distrust (close to hatred) of humans because of the crimes committed against her people; however, through her association with Arc she may be modifying her outlook (although she remains cautious and defensive). For travel, she wears a long hooded cloak that is also used to conceal her identity as an elf (in the light novels, it is colored charcoal gray; in the anime, it is purple). Her weapon of choice is a hand-and-a-half double-edged straight-bladed sword; in Volume 1 of the light novels she originally carries and wields a thin saber, but changes weapons in Volume 2 after Arc gives her the Sword of the King of Lions, "an incredibly rare blade which boosted the user's speed and attack power" (which he "liberated" from the Marquis of Diento's secret room). So far her major weaknesses are her physical intolerance for alcohol (two glasses of strong liquor are enough to make her drunk), (in the anime) an almost girlish fondness for Ponta (in the light novels, the feeling is there, but not so strong), (again in the anime) a tendency to sometimes forget that beneath his armor Arc is a skeleton (causing her to freak out and try to explode him when she sees him in an au naturel state), and a feeling of inferiority to her older sister Eevin. Her feelings about Arc seem complicated; she continually acts as though exasperated with Arc and occasionally needles him, but in Volume 2 of the light novel series when her sister Eevin teases her about having a man in her life, "For a moment, the face of a skeleton outfitted in majestic armor flashed through Ariane's mind", in Volume 4 she is extremely distressed when his exposure to the waters of the magic pool render him unconscious for five days, and his culinary skills astonish her (apparently she either isn't very good at cooking or just doesn't know how).

A cotton-tailed fox ("ventu vulpis") with greenish fur and a white-furred underbelly, referred to by elves and beast people as a "spirit creature"; while in the light novels it is not currently stated whether Ponta is male or female, in the anime Ponta is referred to as being female. In the light novel series, Arc finds it imprisoned in a cage, while in the anime he comes across it in the forest; in both cases, the creature has been injured and he uses his magic to heal it and befriend it. In return, it becomes attached to him and joins him as his inseparable companion, and he names it "Ponta" (a variation of the Japanese word "Tanpopo") because its tail reminds him of dandelion fluff. Because "spirit creatures" like Ponta almost never form attachments to humans (and rarely to elves), Ponta's connection with Arc reassures elves and beast people as to Arc's good intentions and reliability. Its favorite perches are either on top of his helmet or on one of his shoulder pauldrons, although it has taken to riding on Ariane's shoulder at times. It is also particularly sensitive to danger and the presence of evil, and is able to glide through the air like a Flying squirrel by means of its patagium either using normal air currents or by using spirit magic to conjure up wind, and Arc trains it to use the magic move Wind Cutter.

A beast girl and one of the six ninjas of the Jinshin clan on an ongoing mission to locate and free enslaved beast people. Though physically the size of a young girl, she is extremely fast, skillful in combat and adept at using a type of Water ninjutsu. "Chiyome" is not her actual name, and Arc deduces that she was given the name in honor of famous kunoichi Mochizuki Chiyome. Chapter 2.5 of Volume 5 of the light novels reveals her real name: "Mia", and her backstory reveals that she is an orphan (her father had been enslaved by human and worked to death and her mother had been killed protecting Chiyome after their escape from captivity) and had been taken into the Jinshin Clan at her own request. Arc and Ariane assist her and fellow ninja Goemon in freeing the enslaved beast people in Olav and totally destroying the slave markets. As the light novel series progresses, she at first provides them with intel as to the location of human nobles involves in the elf slave trade and later joins them full time on their travels and adventures, becoming close and firm friends with Ariane along the way. Naturally, in both the light novels and anime she freaks out when she first sees Arc's unhelmeted face, but she overcomes this and accepts/respects him as an ally and friend. Arc also sees her as a good friend, but her sometimes stoic demeanor and attitude make him unsure of her feelings towards him.

Danka Niel Maple, an elf warrior of Maple (the surname causes Arc to mistake him for either Ariane's sibling or husband). His mission was to investigate the town of Diento for the location of captured and enslaves elves. While initially suspicious of Arc, he comes to respect Arc's abilities and accept him (for the time being) as a comrade-in-arms (although, in Volume 6 of the light novel series, he makes it clear that, despite Arc's officially becoming a member of Lalatoya, he still views Arc with suspicion). In the anime, he and Ariane communicate long distance via a Whispering Fowl, another "spirit creature" that resembles a large parrot and can mimic human speech in delivering messages.

Dillan Tahg Lalatoya, the Elder of the elf settlement of Lalatoya and the father of Ariane and Eevin. In the light novel series, he is described as "a twenty- to thirty-year-old elven man with long, green-tinted blond hair", while in the anime he is tall, green-blond-haired and slenderly built with a short Van Dyke beard. He officially hires Arc to assist Ariane with her mission of freeing enslaved elves and later acts as an envoy to various human kingdoms (much to his wife's annoyance, since this takes him away from home for long periods of time).

Glenys Alna Lalatoya, the wife of Elder Dillan who physically appears to be in her 30's but is (according to her) 100 years old (in the anime, she says that she "just turned 170 this year, and that number isn't changing", causing Ariane to tell Arc that her mother is really 245 years old). She is described in the light novel series as having "amethyst-colored skin and...white hair tied back in braids", while in the anime she has the same pale skin and pink hair as both her daughters (who apparently take after her physically). While an excellent homemaker and housekeeper, she is also a master of swordsmanship and tells Arc that she trained both of her daughters, and with her uncanny skill and speed has no trouble in easily vanquishing the larger, more physically powerful Arc in practice combat sessions. In the light novels, she appears to act as Elder of Lalatoya whenever her husband is away on Council business and has become both Arc and Chiyome's combat trainer.

Ariane's older sister and a famous elf warrior whom Ariane aspires to emulate, which makes it all the more shocking to Ariane when she learns that Eevin is getting married soon. Whatever her reputation and skill as a warrior, Eevin seems to absolutely adore her younger sister (whom she has nicknamed "Arin") and behaves ultra-girlishly in interacting with her, even physically glomping onto Ariane; in the anime, despite her being Ariane's older sister, she looks and acts younger than Ariane. In Book 7 of the light novel series, she confesses her annoyance to a friend that she hasn't been able to keep in contact with Ariane because "[Arc] and Arin have just been teleporting all over the place", and she can never look at Arc without glaring at him, suggesting a growing jealousy that Arc might be displacing Eevin in Ariane's affections. 

A beast-man and one of the six ninjas of the Jinshin clan. Physically, he matches Arc in size and strength (with eyes that seem to have no pupils), and the two instantly become friends. "Goemon" is not his actual name, and Arc deduces that he was given the name in honor of Ishikawa Goemon. Goemon's Rock ninjutsu and Arc's Rock magic are able to resonate with each other to reach a state of almost uncontrollable power. In battle, he and Chiyome act as partners.

Sekt Rondahl Karlon Rhoden Sahdiay, the eldest son of King Karlon of Rhoden, engaged against his younger siblings Dakares and Yuriarna in a power struggle to successfully succeed to the throne of Rhoden. He is secretly backed by the Great West Revlon Empire. Although more polished in his outward showing (although both Arc and Ariane sense something "fake" about him when they first meet him in Volume 7 of the light novel series), he seems to be as ruthless as Dakares, not hesitating to have Dakares assassinated and frame him for Yuriarna's supposed assassination, and now recognizes that Yuriarna, thanks to her successful negotiations with the elves and growing public popularity, is a serious rival. He has also become very wary of Arc since learning of and witnessing Arc's abilities and incredible power at first-hand.

Dakares Ciely Vetran, the second son of King Karlon of Rhoden. It is revealed that he is secretly but actively participating in the elf and beast people slave trade in violation of a 400-year-old peace treaty with the elves. He was secretly backed by the Holy East Revlon Empire in order to gain power for an eventually attempt at a coup d'etat.

Yuriarna Merol Melissa Rhoden Olav, the second daughter of King Karlon of Rhoden, highly intelligent and politically savvy, and possibly the most honorable and reliable of all the king's children, always putting the welfare of the people first. After the events in Diento, she is entrusted with and dispatched by her father on a diplomatic mission to open negotiations with the elves. En route to the Grand Duchy of Limbult, her carriage and escort are attacked and she herself is assassinated, but revived (unknown to her) by Arc's Rejuvenation magic. Reaching Limbult in safety, she keeps her survival secret and successfully completes her mission, in the process gaining the elves' support for her bid for succession to the Rhoden throne.

Domitianus Revlon Valiafelbe, the totally ruthless and amoral ruler of the Holy Revlon Empire, in which the slave trade in elves and beast people is completely legal. It appears that he is intent on destabilizing the Rhoden Kingdom using controlled monsters to terrorize populations and using them as part of his armed forces as part of his eventual plans for invasion; in the anime however, Arc has (currently unknown to either Domitianus or even himself) been foiling Domitianus' plan by defeating the controlled monsters that cross his path, at which time the control rings attached to the monsters shatter and vanish.

Supposedly Dakares' right-hand man, he arranges for the attack on Yuriarna's carriage and her assassination. however, his sudden murder of Dakares and (in the light novel series) his later killing his own father (falsely claiming that he was part of Dakares' plot to assassinate Yuriarna) proves his actual loyalty to Sekt.

Media

Light novel
The light novel series is written by Ennki Hakari with illustrations by KeG, and has been published by Overlap under Overlap Novels imprint since June 25, 2015. As of May 2021, the series is still ongoing with 10 volumes released. Seven Seas Entertainment licensed the series on September 20, 2018, and released the first volume on June 11, 2019.

Manga
In February 2017, the first chapter of the manga adaptation by Akira Sawano was published in Overlap's Comic Gardo; though Akira is the author of the manga series, character designs are credited to KeG. Overlap collected the individual chapters into tankōbon volumes; the first volume was released in August 2017. In September 2018, Seven Seas Entertainment announced its licensing of the manga series for localization in North America under the title Skeleton Knight in Another World.

Anime
An anime television series adaptation was announced on April 17, 2021. The series will be animated by Studio Kai and Hornets and directed by Katsumi Ono, with Takeshi Kikuchi supervising the series' scripts, Tōru Imanishi designing the characters, and eba and Tsubasa Ito composing the series' music. It aired from April 7 to June 23, 2022, on AT-X, Tokyo MX, SUN, and BS11. The opening theme song is "Aa, Waga Roman no Michi Yo" (嗚呼、我が浪漫の道よ, Ah, My Romantic Road) by PelleK, while the ending theme song is "Bokura ga Oroka da Nante Dare ga Itta" (僕らが愚かだなんて誰が言った, Who Called Us Fools?) by DIALOGUE+. Crunchyroll has licensed the series outside of Asia. Muse Communication announced the license for South and Southeast Asia the day after the anime announcement.

On April 11, 2022, Crunchyroll announced that the series would receive an English dub, which premiered on April 28.

Episode list

References

External links
 at Shōsetsuka ni Narō 
 
 
 

2015 Japanese novels
Anime and manga based on light novels
Crunchyroll anime
Isekai anime and manga
Isekai novels and light novels
Japanese webcomics
Light novels
Light novels first published online
Muse Communication
Seven Seas Entertainment titles
Shōnen manga
Shōsetsuka ni Narō
Studio Kai
Webcomics in print